Xenorhabdus mauleonii  is a bacterium from the genus of Xenorhabdus which has been isolated from an undescribed Steinernema species.

References

Further reading

External links
Type strain of Xenorhabdus mauleonii at BacDive -  the Bacterial Diversity Metadatabase

Bacteria described in 2006